Jarret John "JJ" Thomas (born April 6, 1981) is an American snowboard coach for the US half pipe team

References

 FIS-Ski.com - FIS Competition Results
 

1981 births
Living people
American male snowboarders
Snowboarders at the 2002 Winter Olympics
Medalists at the 2002 Winter Olympics
Olympic bronze medalists for the United States in snowboarding